The men's team single-shot 100 meter running deer competition was one of 15 shooting sports events on the Shooting at the 1908 Summer Olympics programme. Teams consisted of four shooters. The runs lasted about 4 seconds each and took place  distant from the shooter. There were three concentric circles on the target, with the smallest counting for 4 points, the middle for 3, and the outermost for 2. A hit outside the circles but still on the target (except on the haunch) counted for 1 point. The maximum possible score was thus 40 points per shooter, or 160 for the team.

Only 2 teams competed.

Results

References

Sources
 
 

Men's rifle running deer team
100 meter running deer at the Olympics